The Furness Railway 21 class (classified "K2" by Bob Rush) or "Larger Seagulls", were built a class of eight 4-4-0 steam locomotives designed by W. F. Pettigrew and built by Sharp, Stewart and Company of Glasgow for the Furness Railway. Six were built in 1896, and two more in 1900. They were built to supersede the 120 class on the heavier and more important trains and were in turn replaced on the railway’s top trains with the 115 class in the 1920s. They had  diameter driving wheels with  cylinders.

Numbering
The first six of 1896 were numbered 21, 22, 34, 35, 36 and 37 by the Furness Railway (works numbers were 4174–4179). In 1900, two extra engines were added to the class, Furness Railway numbers 124–125. (works numbers 4651–4652). In 1913, two engines, FR Nos. 34 and 37, were fitted with experimental Phoenix smokebox superheaters, however, these were removed the following year. At some point in time locomotives 21, 22, 34 and 35 were renumbered 44–47 respectively.

By 1923 and the grouping of the FR into the London, Midland and Scottish Railway, all eight engines were still in service, and received LMS numbers, these being 10135–10142 (in order of their later numbers). They lasted until the late 1920s and early 1930s, performing secondary duties on the home turf, between Barrow-in-Furness and Whitehaven.

Tenders
The six-wheeled tenders that this class used were also used by the Furness Railway D3 0-6-0 tender engines.

In fiction
Edward the Blue Engine, from the Railway Series books and the spin-off television series Thomas the Tank Engine & Friends, is described as bearing "a quite striking similarity" to the Furness 'Larger Seagulls'. The Edwardian 4-4-0 type is a fairly common design pattern in British steam locomotives. However Edward differs in having a cab with dual glazed side windows, a much more characteristic feature of North Eastern railway locomotives. The tapered non-circular spectacle plate windows and the higher boiler line are distinctively those of the NER Class R1.

See also
 Locomotives of the Furness Railway

References

Bibliography

 

K2
4-4-0 locomotives
Sharp Stewart locomotives
Railway locomotives introduced in 1896
Scrapped locomotives
Standard gauge steam locomotives of Great Britain